Jonas Hayes (born August 9, 1981) is an American college basketball coach and former player. He is the current head coach of Georgia State. He previously served as an assistant coach, and later interim head coach, for the Xavier Musketeers. He was also an assistant coach for the Morehouse Maroon Tigers, South Carolina State Bulldogs, Belmont Abbey Crusaders, and Georgia Bulldogs. Hayes played college basketball for the Western Carolina Catamounts and Georgia Bulldogs.

College career
Hayes and his twin brother, Jarvis, initially enrolled at Western Carolina University in 1999 to play for the Western Carolina Catamounts. In his freshman season, Hayes averaged 8.0 points, 4.9 rebounds, 0.2 assists, 0.7 steals, and 0.5 blocks per game on an average of 18.4 minutes. He shot 63.0% from field goal range and 51.2% from the free throw line. His field goal percentage was the highest in the Southern Conference and the 12th-highest at the NCAA Division I level. Hayes played in 24 games and started one game at Western Carolina. The brothers initially remained there for one season before transferring to the University of Georgia in 2000.

Hayes had to sit out his sophomore season due to a former transfer rule. In his junior season, Hayes averaged 7.2 points, 5.0 rebounds, 0.5 assists, 0.6 steals, and 0.3 blocks per game on an average of 20.9 minutes. He shot 55.5% from field goal range and 71.4% from the free throw line. That year, he helped the Bulldogs to the NCAA Division I Tournament and had 14 points and 14 rebounds in the team's first round win over Murray State. In his senior season, Hayes averaged 6.7 points, 4.4 rebounds, 0.7 assists, 0.4 steals, and 0.3 blocks per game on average of 21.1 minutes. He shot 52.8% from field goal range and 61.4% from the free throw line. In his fifth-year season, Hayes averaged 11.9 points, 5.3 rebounds, 1.0 assists, 0.8 steals, and 0.1 blocks per game on an average of 28.4 minutes. He shot 51.2% from field goal range and 65.7% from the free throw line. He graduated from the University of Georgia in 2004 with a bachelor's degree in child and family development.

Coaching career
Following the end of his collegiate playing career, Hayes spent one season as assistant coach at Frederick Douglass High School (Atl). One year later he was hired by Morehouse College to be an assistant coach for the men's basketball team in 2005. He remained with the team for one season before being hired as an assistant for the South Carolina State Bulldogs. In 2007, Belmont Abbey College hired Hayes to be an assistant, a post he remained at until 2012.

In 2012, Hayes returned to his alma mater as an operations coordinator for the men's basketball team. In 2013, he was promoted to the role of assistant coach. In his first three seasons as an assistant on Mark Fox's staff, the Bulldogs won 20 or more games, making an NCAA Tournament and two NIT Tournament appearances. Hayes is credited with aiding the development of forwards like Marcus Thornton and Yante Maten. He remained with Georgia until Fox's firing in 2018.

In 2018, Hayes was hired as an assistant coach for the Xavier Musketeers. In 2021, he was promoted to the role of associate head coach. Following the firing of Travis Steele at the end of the 2021–22 regular season, Hayes was named the interim head coach of the team. He led the Musketeers to the school's second-ever NIT championship.

Georgia State
On April 6, 2022 Hayes was announced as the head coach of Georgia State.

Head coaching record

Personal life
Hayes's twin brother, Jarvis, was born five minutes ahead of him and is a former National Basketball Association player and current college coach.

References

1981 births
Living people
African-American basketball players
American men's basketball coaches
American men's basketball players
Basketball coaches from Georgia (U.S. state)
Basketball players from Atlanta
University of Georgia alumni
College men's basketball head coaches in the United States
Georgia Bulldogs basketball coaches
Georgia Bulldogs basketball players
People from Atlanta
Xavier Musketeers men's basketball coaches
20th-century African-American sportspeople
21st-century African-American sportspeople